5010 may refer to:

 A.D. 5010, a year in the 6th millennium CE
 5010 BCE, a year in the 6th millennium BC
 5010, a number in the 5000 (number) range
 NGC 5010, an elliptical galaxy
 5010 Amenemhêt, a main-belt asteroid
 Hawaii Route 5010, a state highway
 5010th Air Base Wing, a United States military unit
 IBM System/7, formerly designated the IBM 5010
 Nine ANSI ASC X12 005010 EDI transaction sets mandated by HIPAA for medical transactions, under the auspices of the United States Centers for Medicare and Medicaid Services

See also